The music of Solomon Islands has received international attention since before the country became independent from the United Kingdom in 1978.

Folk music

Traditional Melanesian music in Solomon Islands includes both group and solo vocals, slit-drum and panpipe ensembles.  Panpipe orchestras, which are well known on Malaita and Guadalcanal use up to ten performers with different instrument, each with unique tunings.

Popular music

In the 1920s bamboo music gained a following in several countries.  Bamboo music was made by hitting open-ended bamboo tubes of varying sizes, originally with coconut husks.  After American soldiers brought their sandals to the Solomon Islands, these replaced coconut husks by the early 1960s, just as the music began spreading to Papua New Guinea.

In the 1950s, Edwin Nanau Sitori composed the song "Walkabout long Chinatown", which was to become popular throughout the Pacific, and has been referred to by the government as the unofficial "national song" of Solomon Islands.

Modern Solomon Islander popular music includes various kinds of rock and reggae as well as something known as island music, a guitar and ukulele ensemble format influenced by Polynesian and Christian music.

Traditional Melanesian choir singing features heavily in the soundtrack of the film The Thin Red Line, which is set against the backdrop of the Battle for Guadalcanal.

Rorogwela
In 1969/1970, ethnomusicologist Hugo Zemp recorded a number of local songs which were released on an LP in 1973, as a part of the UNESCO Musical Sources collection. One of the songs, a lullaby named "Rorogwela", sung by Afunakwa, a Northern Malaita woman, was used as a vocal sample in a 1992 single "Sweet Lullaby" by the French electronica duo Deep Forest, becoming a worldwide hit but also causing some controversy over perceived "pillaging" of the world music heritage by Western musicians. This is because while the single went on to be successful, Afunakwa was not originally credited for singing the vocal sample. Deep Forest claimed they had asked permission of her to use her voice on their single, but it was later revealed she was never consulted before the song was made. 

Rorogwela's melody was also used in Jan Garbarek's "Pygmy Lullaby". It was named as such because he thought the melody used in Deep Forest's "Sweet Lullaby" was African. Later, when he learned the melody was actually from Solomon Islands, he agreed to no longer refer to it as "Pygmy Lullaby". Also, he did not use the vocal track by Afunakwa, only the melody from the song.

The lyrics to Rorogwela translate to: 
Young brother, young brother, be quiet You are crying, but our father has left us He has gone to the place of the dead To protect the living, to protect the orphan child.

Music institutions

There is a Wantok Music Festival.

Solomon Islander musicians

Sharzy
Dezine
Jahboy
56 Hop Rod
Rosie Delmah
DMP
Onetox
Jah Roots
Native Stonage
T cage
Jambeat
Sisiva
Kumara Vibes 
Zabana Ambassadas
Sean Rii
Jaro Local
Young Davie

Notes

References
Feld, Steven. "Bamboo Boogie-Woogie". 2000.  In Broughton, Simon and Ellingham, Mark  with McConnachie, James and Duane, Orla (Ed.), World Music, Vol. 2: Latin & North America, Caribbean, India, Asia and Pacific, pp 183–188. Rough Guides Ltd, Penguin Books.

Further reading

External links
In search of Afunakwa on YouTube
Sisiva - Tutuani on YouTube